Karen Surenovich Khachaturian (Moscow, 19 September 1920 – Moscow, 19 July 2011) was a Soviet and Russian composer of Armenian ethnicity and the nephew of composer Aram Khachaturian.

Khachaturian was born in Moscow, the son of Suren Khachaturian, a theatrical director. His studies under Genrikh Litinsky at the Moscow Conservatory were interrupted by a term of duty in the entertainment division of the Red Army. Resuming his studies in 1945, he worked with Dmitri Shostakovich and Nikolai Myaskovsky.

In addition to a Violin Sonata (1947), his works include a Cello Sonata (1966), a String Quartet (1969), four symphonies (1955, 1968, 1982, 1991) and a ballet, Cipollino (1973), as well as various other orchestral works and music for the theater and films.

Rhythmic drive and a careful and idiomatic use of his instrumental forces characterize his compositions. He adopted a primarily tonal approach to composition. His works have been recorded by artists including David Oistrakh, Jascha Heifetz, Mstislav Rostropovich, and Vladimir Yampolsky. A recording of the opening of his first symphony was played in a lecture-demonstration given at the University of Warwick during the first academic year in which it had undergraduates (1965–1966), by Geoffrey Bush.

Works
String trio for violin, viola, and cello 
Violin Sonata, in G minor, Op. 1 composed in 1947. (for Leonid Kogan) – recorded by J. Heifetz and L. Steuber for RCA Victor Gold in 1966. n. of disc is – (GD87872)
Cello Sonata, dedicated to Mstislav Rostropovich. First performed January 10, 1967
String quartet.
Trio for Violin, Horn and Piano
4 symphonies (as noted above)
Viy
 Cipollino, ballet in 3 acts (1973)

Awards
Khachaturian was awarded the Order "For Merit to the Fatherland", 4th class (2007), the Order of Honour (2000) and the Order of Friendship (1995). He was awarded the title People's Artist of the RSFSR (1981) and the USSR State Prize (1976, for the ballet "Cipollino") and the State Prize of the Russian Federation (2001). He also received the Diploma of the Russian Federation President (March 6, 2011 – for great contribution to the development of national culture and the many years of creative activity) and the Moscow City Hall prize (1999).

References

External links
Profile from International Music Publishers Hans Sikorski in English

1920 births
2011 deaths
20th-century classical composers
20th-century Russian male musicians
21st-century classical composers
21st-century Russian male musicians
Musicians from Moscow
Communist Party of the Soviet Union members
Moscow Conservatory alumni
Academic staff of Moscow Conservatory
People's Artists of the RSFSR
Recipients of the Order "For Merit to the Fatherland", 4th class
Recipients of the Order of Honour (Russia)
Recipients of the USSR State Prize
State Prize of the Russian Federation laureates
Pupils of Nikolai Myaskovsky
Russian people of Armenian descent
Russian film score composers
Russian male classical composers
Russian male composers
Russian music educators
Soviet film score composers
Soviet male classical composers
Soviet male composers
Soviet music educators
Burials at Novodevichy Cemetery